{{Infobox football league

| pixels     = 150px
| country    = Australia
| founded    = 2011  {{small|pre-2010 (as NNSW Interdistrict Division One)}}
| teams      = 12
| promotion  = 
| relegation = Zone League One
| levels     = 4
| domest_cup = Australia Cup
| confed_cup =
|season      = 2022
| champions  = Dudley Redhead United FC
| premiers   = Newcastle Suns FC
| website    =https://websites.mygameday.app/comp_info.cgi?c=0-8218-0-598799-0&pool=1001&a=LADDER 
}}

The Newcastle Zone Football League Premier, Zone Premier League or just ZPL is an Australian football (soccer) league in the North of New South Wales. It is the third tier of football in the Northern New South Wales Football association.

The competition is made up of 12 teams who play each other twice, home and away. This is an amateur football league.

 History 
In the inaugural 2011 season, New Lambton Eagles FC won the premiership, ahead of Morisset FC by two points. Cooks Hill United FC won the championship, beating Morisset FC 2-1 in the grand final. After finish runners-up in the league and grand final, Morisset FC were relegated to Zone League One in 2012 after finishing last (10th) with one point.

Morisset FC do not currently compete in any of the four Zone Leagues.

After the 2011 season, Thornton Park (now Thornton Redbacks FC) were elected for promotion to Northern NSW State League Division 1.

2015 saw 3 more teams promoted into the Northern NSW State League Division 1 from ZPL as a result of league restructuring. These teams were Cooks Hill United FC, Kahibah FC and Wallsend FC. The applications from Morisset FC and Swansea FC were unsuccessful.

2017 saw another team promoted to State League Division One (now HIT Northern League One) in New Lambton Eagles FC, the same club that won the inaugural Zone Premier League season.

Since 2017, there has been no more promotion to Northern League One.

Although, the Board of Directors that took reign of Northern NSW Football in early 2023 have stated their intention to provide options to establish promotion and relegation in men’s football in Northern NSW, extending from NPL Men’s NNSW to the Zone Premier Leagues.

2023 sees the expansion of the Zone Premier League from 10 to 12 teams among a greater restructure of the Zone Football Leagues, seeing the pyramid reduce from 4 leagues to 3 after the omission of Zone League Three. Newcastle Olympic FC and Minmi Wanderers FC have been promoted from Zone League One. There were no relegated teams.

 Format 

The Zone Premier League competition consists of 12 teams, each of whom have a first grade side, reserve grade side and third grade side. The regular season takes place over 22 rounds, with each team playing each other once at home and once away. The team that finishes first at the end of the regulars season is crowned premiers.

The top four teams contest the Finals Series. The format for 2022 included semi finals and finals. For the semi finals, 1st vs 4th and 2nd vs 3rd. The winner of each semi-final progresses straight to the Grand Final where the winner of that game is crowned champions.

 2023 Season Teams 

Cardiff City FC
Dudley Redhead United SFC
Hamilton Azzurri FC
Kotara South FC
Mayfield United SFC
Minmi Wanderers FC PNewcastle Olympic FC PNewcastle Suns FC
Newcastle University Men's FC P
Swansea FC
Warners Bay FC
Westlakes Wildcats FC

All teams are required to present in 3 grades.Italics'' indicate the club has a team in a higher division.

P Promoted.

Past Seasons

Notes

References 
 Newcastle Football
 Macquarie Football
 Hunter Valley Football
 Northern NSW Football 
 Newcastle Zone Football Leagues
 Football In Australia

Soccer leagues in New South Wales